Weißenthurm is a Verbandsgemeinde ("collective municipality") in the district of Mayen-Koblenz, in Rhineland-Palatinate, Germany. The seat of the municipality is in Weißenthurm.

The Verbandsgemeinde Weißenthurm consists of the following Ortsgemeinden ("local municipalities"):

 Bassenheim
 Kaltenengers
 Kettig
 Mülheim-Kärlich
 Sankt Sebastian
 Urmitz
 Weißenthurm

Verbandsgemeinde in Rhineland-Palatinate